HostAP was one of the most popular IEEE 802.11 device drivers for Linux and since November 2016 is officially obsolete in Linux kernel. It works with cards using the Conexant (formerly Intersil) Prism 2/2.5/3 chipset and support Host AP mode, which allows a WLAN card to perform all the functions of a wireless access point.

The driver code was written by Jouni Malinen, hired by Atheros in 2008, and was included into the main kernel tree in Linux 2.6.14.

See also 
Hostapd
wpa supplicant
 Intel PRO/Wireless 2200BG AP Driver for Linux, an open source 802.11 b/g access point driver for the ipw2200 and ipw2915

References

External links 
 HostAP Homepage
 Network overview by Rami Rosen 

Wi-Fi
Linux drivers